Online outsourcing is the business process of contracting third-party providers (often overseas) to supply products or services which are delivered and paid for via the internet.

Background 

Online outsourcing is the internet-based version of outsourcing. This process is when one department, or indeed a whole area of work, transfers tasks and projects to a third party company. 

Examples of such tasks could be programming, web development and web design, multi-media production, logo design or search engine optimization not forgetting services like translations, research and editorial work. In this case, online platforms can serve to simplify the process of attaining and assigning projects.

With offshoring, a variant of outsourcing, respective tasks can be situated in another country. This could be both business tasks or indeed business processes.

With nearshoring, offshoring also has its own variant. While the former relocates tasks to a country usually very far afield on another continent, the latter is, as the name suggests, relocation closer to home.

Homeshoring, as a variant of outsourcing, describes the location of third party services which are not undertaken by companies but by remote workers.

Through outsourcing a company can relieve itself of secondary tasks and concentrate on core issues, thus improving its efficiency. Or as Peter Drucker expressed it, "Do what you can do best and Outsource the rest."

According to Deloitte’s research, the primary reason to outsource jobs is to save costs (59%). The second reason is to focus on core competencies (57%). 47% of companies outsource to solve capacity issues.

See also 
 E-lancing
 Virtual assistance

References 

Outsourcing